Eldon Raynor (26 April 1933 in Bermuda – 3 November 2022) was a Bermudian cricketer. He was a right-handed batsman and a right-arm slow bowler. He played one first-class match for Bermuda, against New Zealand in 1972. It was the maiden first-class match to be played by the Bermuda cricket team.

Raynor died on 3 November 2022.

References

External links
Cricket Archive profile
Cricinfo profile

1933 births
2022 deaths
Bermudian cricketers